Levinson is an Ashkenazi Jewish surname meaning "son of Levi". Notable people with the surname include:

 André Levinson (1887–1933), French dance journalist
 Arik Levinson, American economist
 Arthur D. Levinson (born 1950), American businessman
 Barry Levinson (born 1942), American film director and screenwriter 
 Boris Levinson (1919-2002), Russian theatre and film actor 
 Daniel Levinson (1920–1994), American psychologist
 Eric L. Levinson, American judge
 Feodor Levinson-Lessing (1861–1939), Russian geologist
 Gerald Levinson (born 1951), American composer
 Harold Levinson, American dyslexia researcher
 Horace Clifford Levinson (1895–1968), American mathematician
 Jerrold Levinson (born 1948), American philosophy professor
 Jessica Levinson, American law professor
 Joel Moss Levinson (born 1979/1980), American comedian
 Jonathan Levinson, fictional character (Buffy the Vampire Slayer)
Mark Levinson
 Mark Levinson (born 1946), American audio equipment designer (Mark Levinson Audio Systems)
 Mark Levinson, American film director
 Nathan Levinson (1888–1952), American sound engineer
 Norman Levinson (1912–1975), American mathematician
 Paul Levinson (born 1947), American author
 Richard Levinson (1934–1987), American writer and producer
 Robert Levinson (born 1948; disappeared 2007), American DEA and FBI agent
 Ronald B. Levinson (1896–1980), American philosopher 
 Salmon Levinson (1865-1941), Attorney active in the Peace Movement in early 1900's
 Sam Levinson (born 1985), American actor
 Sanford Levinson (born 1941), American law professor
 Stephen C. Levinson (born 1947), British linguist
 Steven H. Levinson (born 1946), American judge

The variants Levinsohn and Lewinsohn may refer to:

 Isaac Baer Levinsohn (1788–1860), Ukrainian-Hebrew scholar and writer
 Joshua Lewinsohn (born 1833; death date unknown), Russian teacher and writer
 Ross Levinsohn, American media executive

See also
 Levison
 Levenson
 Leveson
 Livingstone (name)

References

Surnames of Scottish origin
Americanized surnames
English-language surnames
Jewish surnames
Levite surnames
Yiddish-language surnames
Patronymic surnames